A Touch of Velvet may refer to:

A Touch of Velvet, album by Jimmy Velvet
A Touch of Velvet, album by Jim Reeves
"A Touch of Velvet, a Sting of Brass", instrumental by  Mark Wirtz